German submarine U-3504 was a Type XXI U-boat (one of the "Elektroboote") of Nazi Germany's Kriegsmarine, built for service in World War II. She was ordered on 6 November 1943, and was laid down on 30 June 1944 at F Schichau GmbH, Danzig, as yard number 1649. She was launched on 15 August 1944, and commissioned under the command of Kapitänleutnant Karl-Hartwig Siebold on 23 September 1944.

Design
Like all Type XXI U-boats, U-3504 had a displacement of  when at the surface and  while submerged. The submarine was powered by two MAN SE supercharged six-cylinder M6V40/46KBB diesel engines each providing , two Siemens-Schuckert GU365/30 double-acting electric motors each providing , and two Siemens-Schuckert silent running GV232/28 electric motors each providing .

U-3504 was fitted with six  torpedo tubes in the bow and four  C/30 anti-aircraft guns. She could carry twenty-three torpedoes or seventeen torpedoes and twelve mines. The complement was five officers and fifty-two men.

Fate
U-3504 was scuttled on 2 May 1945, at  Wilhelmshaven, as part of Operation Regenbogen. The wreck was later raised and broken up.

References

Bibliography

External links
 

Type XXI submarines
U-boats commissioned in 1944
U-boats sunk in 1945
World War II submarines of Germany
1944 ships
Ships built in Danzig
Operation Regenbogen (U-boat)
Ships built by Schichau
Maritime incidents in May 1945